This is a list of years in Ukraine. See also the timeline of Ukrainian history.  For only articles about years in Ukraine that have been written, see :Category:Years in Ukraine.

21st century

20th century

19th century

18th century

17th century

See also 
 Timeline of Kharkiv
 Timeline of Kiev
 Timeline of Lviv
 Timeline of Odessa

Further reading

External links
 

 
Ukraine history-related lists
Ukraine